The Uganda national cricket team, nicknamed the Cricket Cranes, is the men's team that represents Uganda in international cricket. The team is organised by the Uganda Cricket Association, which has been an associate member of the International Cricket Council (ICC) since 1998.

Uganda first fielded an international team as early as 1914, against the East Africa Protectorate, but only began competing regularly from the early 1950s, playing frequent series against regional rivals Kenya and Tanzania (then Tanganyika). From 1966, Uganda contributed players to a combined East African team, which was reconstituted as East and Central Africa in 1989.

The country's first ICC tournament played in its own right was the 2001 ICC Trophy in Canada. Uganda played in the next three editions of the tournament, renamed the ICC World Cup Qualifier, but did not come close to qualifying for the Cricket World Cup. In the World Cricket League (WCL), Uganda reached ICC World Cricket League Division Two on three occasions, but was relegated to Division Three each time. The team has twice participated in the ICC World Twenty20 Qualifier, in 2012 and 2013, but finished in the bottom four teams on both occasions.

History

East Africa team

Uganda combined with their regional rivals Kenya and Tanzania to form the East Africa team. The first known match for this team was against a South African "Non-Europeans" team captained by Basil D'Oliveira in September 1958 in Nairobi, with the visitors winning by seven wickets. East Africa became an associate member of the ICC in 1966

East Africa toured England in 1972 and the Marylebone Cricket Club played a first-class match against East Africa in January 1974, winning by 237 runs. The following year, East Africa played in the 1975 Cricket World Cup in England. After various warm-up games, including a 3 wicket win against Glamorgan, they played New Zealand, India and England in the World Cup itself, losing all three matches. The World Cup was followed by a first-class match against Sri Lanka at the County Ground, Taunton, which the Sri Lankans won by 115 runs. East Africa played in the ICC Trophies of 1979, 1982 and 1986, without qualifying for the World Cup from any of them.

Uganda continued playing their regular matches against Kenya and Tanzania, despite Kenya leaving the East Africa combination in and the triangular tournament became a quadrangular tournament in 1966 when Zambia joined in. From then until the tournament's end in 1980, Uganda won the tournament just once.

East and Central Africa cricket team

The East Africa team left the ICC in 1989 and was replaced by the East and Central Africa team the same year. This new team was a combination of Malawi, Tanzania, Uganda and Zambia, and they took part in the ICC Trophy for the first time in 1990, also taking part in 1994, 1997 and 2001.

Setting out on their own

Uganda left the East and Central Africa combination and became an associate member of the ICC in their own right in 1998. Their first international tournament was the 2001 ICC Trophy. After winning all five of their first round games, they lost a play-off match against the United Arab Emirates (UAE) for the right to enter the second stage of the tournament. The following year, they finished third in their group in the Africa Cup.

In 2004, Uganda played their first first-class matches in the ICC Intercontinental Cup against Kenya and Namibia, winning against Namibia. In August that year, they finished second to Namibia in the Africa Cricket Association Championships in Zambia. This qualified them for the following years ICC Trophy, in which they finished in twelfth and last place after losing to Papua New Guinea in their final play-off match. Earlier in the year, they again played against Namibia and Kenya in the 2005 ICC Intercontinental Cup, losing both games.

2007-2018

In January 2007, Uganda faced Bermuda and Canada as those two teams prepared for Division One of the World Cricket League in Nairobi. This also served as preparation for Uganda's visit to Darwin, Australia, for Division Three of the same tournament. Uganda won their Group B games against the Cayman Islands, Hong Kong, and Tanzania before beating Papua New Guinea in the semi-final and Argentina in the tournament final. Winning Division Three earned Uganda a spot in the ICC's High Performance Program, and promotion to Division Two.

Uganda took part in a four-team Twenty20 tournament before the 2007 Twenty20 World Cup, playing games against Pakistan, Kenya, and Bangladesh in Nairobi. As expected, they lost against Pakistan and Bangladesh before upsetting African rivals Kenya with a two-wicket win.

Their next matches were two one-day games against Bermuda, also in Nairobi, in October 2007. They surprised their more experienced rivals, going down by just seven runs after Nandikishore Patel scored a half-century, before winning the second match by 43 runs with Joel Olwenyi scoring a half-century of his own.

In November 2007, Uganda travelled to Windhoek, Namibia to participate in the WCL Division Two tournament. Uganda lost their group matches against; Denmark, Namibia, Oman, and the UAE but did defeat Argentina in their group match and also their positional playoff to finish fifth. Uganda's bottom two finish saw them relegated to Division Three.

In January 2009, Uganda won four of their five group matches and edged Papua New Guinea on run rate, to finish second in the ICC Division 3 competition in Buenos Aires, Argentina and earn the final place at the 2009 ICC World Cup Qualifier.

In April 2009, Uganda travelled to South Africa for the 2009 ICC World Cup Qualifier. Despite a first up win against Namibia, Uganda lost their remaining four Group A matches and failed to make the Super Eight stage, thus ending their chance to qualify for the 2011 Cricket World Cup. Uganda finished 10th overall after beating Denmark but losing to Bermuda in positional playoff matches, and thus was relegated to 2013 ICC World Cricket League Division Three.

In August 2018, Uganda replaced Ghana in the 2018 Africa T20 Cup, after Ghana had declined Cricket South Africa's invite to compete in the tournament. Uganda played in the 2019 T20 World Cup Qualifier Africa but got to the fourth position of the table.

2018–present
In April 2018, the ICC decided to grant full Twenty20 International (T20I) status to all its members. Therefore, all Twenty20 cricket matches played between Uganda and other ICC members since 1 January 2019 have been full T20I matches. 

After April 2019, Uganda will play in the 2019–21 ICC Cricket World Cup Challenge League.

Governing body 

The Uganda Cricket Association (UCA) is responsible for all matches played in Uganda and by the Uganda cricket team. It was admitted to the International Cricket Council in 1998 as an associate member. Its current headquarters are in Kampala, Uganda.

International Grounds

Tournament history

World Cup

1975 to 1987: See East African cricket team
1992 to 1999: See East and Central African cricket team
2003: Did not qualify
2007: Did not qualify
2011: Did not qualify
2015: Did not qualify
2019: Did not qualify

ICC World Twenty20 Qualifier

2013: 13th place
2015: Did not qualify
2019: Did not qualify
2022: 5th place

ICC Intercontinental Cup

2004: First round
2005: First round
2006: Did not participate
2007–08: Did not participate

World Cricket League

2007 Division Three: Champions –  promoted
2007 Division Two: 5th place – relegated
2007 Division Three: 2nd place – promoted
2011 Division Two: 5th place – relegated
2013 Division Three: 2nd place – qualify for WCQ
2014 Division Three: 2nd place – promoted
2015 Division Two: 5th place – relegated
2017 Division Three: 5th place – relegated
2018 Division Four: Champions – promoted
2018 Division Three: 6th place – relegated

ICC World Cup Qualifier

1979 to 1986: See East African cricket team
1990 to 1997: See East and Central African cricket team
2001: 10th place
2005: 12th place
2009: 10th place
2014: 10th place
2018: Did not qualify

ACA Africa T20 Cup
2022: Champions

Records and Statistics 

International Match Summary — Uganda
 
Last updated 23 December 2022

Twenty20 International 

 Highest team total: 185/9 v Rwanda, 14 December 2022 at Gahanga International Cricket Stadium, Kigali
 Highest individual score: 100*, Simon Ssesazi v Tanzania, 22 December 2022 at Gahanga International Cricket Stadium, Kigali
 Best individual bowling figures: 6/7, Dinesh Nakrani v Lesotho, 19 October 2021 at IPRC Cricket Ground, Kigali

Most T20I runs for Uganda

Most T20I wickets for Uganda

T20I record versus other nations

Records complete to T20I #1983. Last updated 23 December 2022.

Players

Personnel

Current squad 
This lists all the players who were been part of the most recent One-day or T20I squad. Updated as of 23 December 2022.

Coaching and managing staff

Captains

Coaches

See also

Uganda women's national cricket team
List of Uganda Twenty20 International cricketers

References

National
National cricket teams
Cricket
National